John Pareanga (born 2 October 1980) in Cook Islands is a footballer who plays as a defender who played for Matavera in the Cook Islands Round Cup and the Cook Islands national football team.

Now, he is an assistant referee at Cook Islands Football Association. He officiated matches at 2016 OFC Nations Cup.

References

1980 births
Living people
Cook Islands international footballers
Association football defenders
Cook Island footballers
Cook Island football referees
1998 OFC Nations Cup players
2000 OFC Nations Cup players